What Else Does The Time Mean? is the 46th album from avant- folk/blues singer-songwriter Jandek. It was released by Corwood Industries (#0784). It is his third release in 2006, following January's' Khartoum Variations and February's live double-album Newcastle Sunday.

Track listing

References

2006 albums
Jandek albums
Corwood Industries albums